Gandhi Jayanti is an event celebrated in India to mark the birthday of Mahatma Gandhi. It is celebrated annually on 2 October, and is one of the three national holidays of India. The UN General Assembly announced on 15 June 2007 that it adopted a resolution which declared that 2 October will be celebrated as the International Day of Non-Violence as he was a non-violent freedom fighter. He is also known as the "Father of The Nation" and this title was given to him by Netaji Subhash Chandra Bose for his relentless struggles for independence.

Commemoration
Gandhi Jayanti is celebrated yearly on 2 October. It is a national holiday, observed in all of its states and territories. Gandhi Jayanti is marked by prayer services and tributes all over India, including at Gandhi's memorial, Raj Ghat, in New Delhi where he was cremated. Popular activities include prayer meetings, commemorative ceremonies in different cities by colleges, local government institutions and socio-political institutions. Gandhi Jayanti Speech, Painting, Essay and Mahatma Gandhi quiz competitions are conducted. On this day awards are granted for projects in schools and the community encouraging a nonviolent way of life as well as celebrating Gandhi's effort in the Indian independence movement. Gandhi's favourite Bhajan (Hindu devotional song), Raghupati Raghav Raja Ram, is usually sung in his memory. Statues of Mahatma Gandhi throughout the country are decorated with flowers and garlands, and some people avoid drinking alcohol or eating meat on the day. Public buildings, banks and post offices are closed. On the occasion of Gandhi Jayanti 2014, Prime Minister Narendra Modi started the Swachh Bharat Mission. Its second phase started on Gandhi Jayanti 2021.

Notes

 

Public holidays in India
October observances
Memorials to Mahatma Gandhi
Birthdays